Shahr-e Zow (formerly, Zavini-ye Pa'in , also Romanized as Zāvīnī-ye Pā’īn and Zāvīn-e Pa’īn, also known as Zoo Sofla, Zow-e Pā’īn, Zao Pāīn, Zow Soflā, and Zū-ye Soflá) is a city and capital of Zavin District, in Kalat County, Razavi Khorasan Province, Iran. At the 2006 census, its population was 4,053, in 959 families.

References 

Populated places in Kalat County
Cities in Razavi Khorasan Province